Legendary Heroes of Africa was a series of postage stamps simultaneously issued and released as a joint issue by the countries of Gambia, Liberia, and Sierra Leone in March 2011 to celebrate Jewish heroes of the  South African Liberation struggle.

Description
The joint issue explicitly recognizes Jews as a people for their contribution, noting: 

All twelve Jews portrayed were of Litvak descent, that is, with roots in the Grand Duchy of Lithuania.

Each country issued a sheet of four multicoloured postage stamps as follows:

Gambia 

Denomination: 25 D

Ruth First
Hilda Bernstein
Lionel "Rusty" Bernstein
Ronald Segal

Liberia 

Denomination: $75

Helen Suzman
Eli Weinberg
Esther Barsel
Hymie Barsel

Sierra Leone 

Denomination: 4500 LE

Yetta Barenblatt
Ray Alexander Simons
Baruch Hirson
Norma Kitson

References

Opposition to apartheid in South Africa
Postage stamps
South African Jews